Dichomeris lissota is a moth in the family Gelechiidae. It was described by Edward Meyrick in 1913. It is found in Assam, India.

The forewings are glossy lilac brown with an oblique-oval dark ochreous-brown spot in the disc at one-third, obscurely whitish edged. There is a small round blackish-fuscous whitish-edged spot representing the second discal stigma and a dark fuscous mark along the costa from the middle to three-fourths, where a slender dark ochreous-brown fascia crosses immediately beyond the second discal stigma to the dorsum before the tornus, edged posteriorly by a pale ochreous slightly bisinuate line. A dark brown line runs along the posterior part of the costa and termen. The hindwings are rather dark fuscous.

References

Moths described in 1913
lissota